The Islamic State insurgency in Iraq is an ongoing low-intensity insurgency that began in 2017 after the Islamic State (ISIS) lost its territorial control in the War in Iraq, during which ISIS and allied White Flags fought the Iraqi military (largely backed by the United States, United Kingdom and other countries conducting airstrikes against ISIS) and allied paramilitary forces (largely backed by Iran).

Context 
The insurgency is a direct continuation of the War in Iraq from 2013 to 2017, with ISIL continuing armed opposition against the Shia-led Iraqi Government. Along with the Islamic State, other insurgents fighting the government include a group known as the White Flags which is reportedly composed of former ISIL members and Kurdish rebels and is believed by the government of Iraq to be part of Ansar al-Islam and possibly affiliated with al-Qaeda. The group operates mostly in the Kirkuk Governorate and has used an assortment of guerilla tactics against government forces. In September 2017, Abu Bakr al-Baghdadi, the leader of ISIL, called on ISIL supporters around the world to launch attacks on Western news media and continued in his message the ISIL must focus on combating the two-pronged attack on the Muslim Ummah; these statements marked a departure from previous rhetoric which was focused on the state building of ISIL and heralded a shift in ISIL's strategy toward a classical insurgency.

Course of the insurgency 
Since ISIL's loss of all territory in Iraq in late 2017 which was declared as Iraq's victory over ISIL and widely seen as an end to the war, and declared as such by Iraq's Prime Minister Haidar al-Abadi, multiple incidents of violence have occurred being carried out by the conflicting sides, in spite of Iraq's declaration of victory over ISIL the group is widely seen as far from gone and continues to retain a presence throughout Iraq, and still capable of carrying out attacks and skirmishes with pro-government forces. ISIL has been waging a guerrilla war with a strong presence in the governorates of Kirkuk, Diyala, Saladin, and Sulaymaniyah, with local forces largely ill-equipped and inexperienced, ISIL has also taken advantage of the areas' rough terrain to carry out operations. ISIL has also made a notable presence in the cities of Kirkuk, Hawija and Tuz Khurmato and has carried out attacks at night in rural areas.

ISIL fighters also reportedly move through villages during the day without interference from security forces, and locals have been asked by ISIL to give fighters food and give information on the whereabouts of Iraqi personnel, locals have also stated that ISIL fighters will frequently enter into Mosques and ask for Zakat to fund the insurgency. Among ISIL's operations include assassinations, kidnappings, raids and ambushes.

As of 2021, U.S. officials warned that ISIL "remains capable of waging a prolonged insurgency” but also described ISIL in Iraq as "diminished”. Iraqi intelligence estimated that ISIL has 2,000–3,000 fighters in Iraq.

Following ISIL's defeat in December 2017, they have been greatly weakened and violence in Iraq has been sharply reduced. 23 civilians lost their lives from violence-related incidents during November 2021, the lowest figure in 18 years.

Timeline

2018

January–April 
Between January and February 2018, Iraqi security forces and Peshmerga clashed with the White Flags around parts of the Kirkuk and Saladin governorates for control of oil fields which the Iraqi government claims the group's priority is. The Iraqi government said in the clashes the composition of the White Flag's fighters are ISIL members and individuals linked to the Kurdish mafia, the government also alleges that the Kurdistan Region allowed oil theft to occur in the area while it was under their control and enabled ISIL for their own interests.

In March 2018, in two separate attacks ISIL reportedly killed 10 individuals including a pro-government Sunni tribal Sheikh along with his son and guests at his house in the town of Al-Shirqat south of Mosul, in the other attack ISIL killed 5 individuals from the same family whom were Iraqi Turkmen and Shia at a fake checkpoint set up by the group posing as Iraqi security forces.

 22 March 2018 - Six individuals and 15 others were at a checkpoint set up by ISIL the group killed six individuals and injured 15 others from the Iraqi Turkmen minority on their way to Erbil from Baghdad between Tuz Khurmato and Daquq to celebrate Nowruz. The attack was condemned by Turkey and Zowaa claimed one of their MPs was present during the attack but managed to escape unharmed.
 2 April 2018 - PMF Major General named Ali Khalifa was killed in an operation around Tuz Khurmato and Kirkuk against ISIL and the White Flags.

June–September 
 8 June 2018 - The Government of Canada announced that it will suspend Canadian support for Peshmerga and work exclusively with the Iraqi government, in a statement a Canadian military official said "We have changed … partners," a Canadian General told reporters about the shift in support "Training with the Peshmerga was ceased when it was no longer of any value in terms of the battle against Da’esh [IS]."
 11 July 2018 - Canadian Prime Minister Justin Trudeau announced that Canada would lead a NATO mission to Iraq with European allies to send 250 Canadian soldiers to Baghdad, 50 will be doing the actual training while the other 125 will be doing force protection and another 20 will help run Canadian headquarters in Baghdad.
 4 August 2018 - Chairman of the Iraqi Baath Party, Izzat Ibrahim al-Douri in a statement broadcast on Facebook in commemoration of the anniversary of the Baath Party called on Iraqis to continue fighting the Iraqi government and allied Iranian backed groups, calling them Safavids. He also called on Saudi Arabia to intervene against Iran's influence in Iraq and praised the country. Additionally, he condemned the battle of Mosul and other battles that led up to it and claimed that Haidar al-Abadi had ordered the destruction of the cities of Ramadi, Tikrit, Fallujah and others.
 6 September 2018 - Mortar fire was reported near the US embassy in Baghdad's Green Zone from a neighborhood controlled by the PMF's component Asa'ib Ahl al-Haq, a Shia paramilitary group backed by Iran. The group fired 120mm mortars, and in response the embassy did take security measures. No casualties or injuries were reported.
 26 September 2018 - An Iraqi commander with the PMF's 21st Brigade survived an ISIL assassination attempt that included the use of a roadside IED in the Mutaibija region of Saladin. While he did survive, three of his guards were reported wounded. ISIL reportedly continues to carry out sporadic clashes with its campaign compared to the 2013 offensive, which eventually led to the 2013–2017 war.

October 
 1 October 2018 - A roadside bomb planted by ISIL in the Kirkuk Governorate near Hawija killed an Iraqi police officer and wounded two others. On the same day, ISIL published photos of a night raid in the village of Daquq, in the southern part of the Kirkuk Governorate, showing fighters burning down the house of a village elder cooperating with the Iraqi government. ISIL also carried out a series of attacks targeting electrical facilities to sabotage the electrical grid to cutoff electricity for the Iraqi military and allied forces around Kirkuk. ISIL fighters also planted explosives around several transmission towers, and the destruction of the towers caused several blackouts in Hawija and Kirkuk.
 3 October 2018 - The Government of Germany announced a planned extension of its military involvement in Iraq for one year to combat ISIL but will end air reconnaissance missions by 31 October 2019. On the same day unknown gunmen, believed to be ISIL, killed an individual by driving up to them in a car and opening fire, the targeted individual reportedly died at the scene as a result of the gunshot wounds.
 4 October 2018 - An operation against ISIL was started by the Iraqi military along with the military forces of France and the United States under the CJTF-OIR coalition in the Anbar Governorate around the city of Qaim and the Syrian border where ISIL continues to operate and maintain a strong and large presence. During the operation ISIL claimed to thwart an American-led assault near the Syrian border and also claimed to have killed 3 US soldiers and wounded 4 others in the clashes, the US military has not confirmed or denied the claimed losses.
 5 October 2018 - US-led coalition planes bombed an ISIL position in the village of Kushaf near the Tigris river in the Kirkuk Governorate, reportedly killing 6 ISIL members. ISIL detonated a roadside bomb, killing an oil employee and injuring 11 others in a bus in Baiji in the Saladin Governorate. In a separate attack in Fallujah in the Anbar Governorate, ISIL detonated a car bomb injuring an Iraqi policeman and 3 others. ISIL released a video from Kirkuk, showing its fighters planting IEDs and carrying out ambushes or raids on Iraqi outposts. The video also claimed that the group has killed and injured more than 927 government forces since 2017 in the Kirkuk region, and in the end video the group executed several individuals in remote areas and assassinated two individuals cooperating with the Iraqi government at their houses.
 7 October 2018 - ISIL claimed responsibility for the detonation of an explosive device in the Kadhimiya neighborhood of Baghdad that resulted in the death and injury of 12 Shiites.
 8 October 2018 - Iraq's interior minister Qasim al-Araji posted a video on his Facebook page which claimed that an unnamed extremist group is behind the murder of 22 year-old Iraqi model Tara Fares. Fares, who won Miss Baghdad in 2015, was shot and killed while driving her car in Baghdad in September. On the same day, ISIL militants shot dead 2 Iraqi Policemen at a checkpoint near Mosul, and fled the scene afterwards.
 9 October 2018 - 4 PMF militia fighters were killed in an attack by ISIL in the Hit district of Al Anbar Governorate.
 10 October 2018 - At least 10 Iraqi security forces were killed when ISIL insurgents attacked a gas field on the western part of Al Anbar Governorate.
 16 October 2018 - An Iraqi policeman was killed while 2 others were injured fighting with ISIL in western Kirkuk. On the same day Iraqi Federal forces detained a Kurdish reporter covering news about strikes in Tuz Khurmatu in anniversary of the Iraqi takeover of Kirkuk.
 17 October 2018 - An unofficial ISIL linked media outlet claimed the death of 6 Badr Organization militia fighters in Diyala as the result of ISIL IED.
 20 October 2018 - An explosive device detonated at a mosque in the Zubeir district of Basra, no group has claimed responsibility nor were any casualties or injuries reported.
 23 October 2018 - A car bomb went off in the Qayyara district of Mosul killing 6 individuals and leaving 30 injured. No group has claimed responsibility for the bombing; however, Iraqi officials have accused ISIL of carrying out the attack.
 24 October 2018 - Turkish foreign minister Mevlüt Çavuşoğlu stated that Turkey would support the Iraqi government in reconstruction and in training the Iraqi military as part of a NATO mission saying, "Iraq's reconstruction is important. We (Turkey) are the most generous country. We pledged $5 billion loan [for Iraq]. Our firms will benefit from this money with investment, trade and by undertaking projects [there]" adding "Now, as NATO, we will train Iraqi security forces".
 26 October 2018 - Five individuals were killed in Al-Ba'aj in the Nineveh Governorate west of Mosul after being abducted by ISIL for cooperating with the Iraqi military by gathering information about the group.
 28 October 2018 - South Korea sent a shipment of 6 KAI T-50 Golden Eagle fighter jets, the Iraqi Ministry of Defense said this was the third shipment of fighters jets provided by South Korea. On the same day the Iraqi military accidentally shelled a village in the Diyala Governorate due to suspicion of ISIL presence. No casualties were reported. This is reportedly the second such incident in the month, with the last incident happening days before.
 29 October 2018 - In response to a successful counter-attack by ISIL against the Syrian Democratic Forces along the Iraqi-Syrian border the Iraqi government deployed PMU militiamen along the border to reinforce sensitive positions in fears of a potential ISIL cross-border infiltration. On the same day Italy announced a planned end to military operations in Iraq in support of both the Kurdistan Regional Government and Iraqi Government by the spring of 2019.
 30 October 2018 - 2 Shiite pilgrims were killed and another injured in an ISIL attack on an Arbaeen celebration in the town of Khanaqin in the Diyala Governorate, after the explosion police reportedly attempted to defuse a device.
 31 October 2018 - A man was killed and his son was injured in a suspected ISIL attack near a shrine in the town of Makhmur, Iraq.

November 
 1 November 2018 - A land mine struck a vehicle of a governor near Baiji, two of his bodyguards were injured while the governor escaped unscathed. Another bomb targeting a military patrol exploded in West Mosul killing a soldier and injuring at least 7 more, ISIL was most likely behind the attack. On the same day clashes occurred between Arab and Kurdish farmers in Daquq due to Arab farmers asking Kurdish farmers to leave the area, while the Kurdish claimed the area was theirs.
 2 November 2018 - ISIL claimed to have killed a French soldier via the Amaq Agency whom was cooperating with Peshmerga in a combined operation in the village of Balkanah in the Tuz Khurmato district of the Kirkuk Governorate, ISIL published the claims in Arabic and French, the French military denied the claim via Twitter. On the same day ISIL began attempted to infiltrate Iraq from Syria in Rabii'a sub district 130 kilometers west of Mosul. In the clashes 4 Iraqi soldiers & 2 ISIL fighters were killed near Iraqi border.
 4 November 2018 - A series of bombings struck several different areas in the capital of Iraq, Baghdad, killing at least 7 people and injuring an additional 14. ISIL claimed responsibility for the bombings.
 8 November 2018 - A car bomb exploded near a restaurant in the Iraqi city of Mosul, killing at least 4 people and injuring 12 according to Iraqi officials. ISIL was most likely behind the attack.
 9 November 2018 - 3 civilians were killed in an armed attack by ISIL in a village located near southern Mosul.
 11 November 2018 - 9 people including 8 civilians and a tribal fighter were killed when ISIL attacked a house of a fighter of the Tribal Mobilization Forces near the Al-Karmah area in Iraq.
 12 November 2018 - 2 people were captured including a policeman and a civilian and then executed by Islamic State militants in a village in the southern Kirkuk Governorate.
 15 November 2018 - A bomb detonated while a police vehicle was travelling from Mosul to a nearby village, leaving 2 civilians dead and a policeman injured. ISIL was most likely behind the attack.
 18 November 2018 - A car bomb detonated in the city of Tikrit, killing 5 civilians and injuring 16 others. ISIL claimed responsibility for the attack.
 19 November 2018 - A bomb and shooting attack on a police patrol killed an officer and wounded 4 others in the area of the Khanaqin. No group claimed responsibility, but ISIL was most likely behind the blast.
 22 November 2018 - A roadside bomb detonated near a bus in a town near Mosul, killing 4 schoolchildren and injuring 7 others. No group claimed responsibility, but the attack was blamed on ISIL. That same day, 2 paramilitary soldiers were killed and 4 others wounded when their vehicle ran over a landmine near the Badush Dam. The landmine had been planted by ISIL.

December 
 6 December 2018 - Unknown gunmen assassinated a commander affiliated Muqtada al-Sadr's Peace Companies.
 15 December 2018 - A coalition airstrike conducted by a B1 Lancer heavy bomber targeting a tunnel entrance West of Mosul in the Atshana Mountains killed 4 ISIL fighters.

2019

January–July 

 14 January 2019 - An ISIL attack on a checkpoint northwest of Kirkuk resulted in the death of 1 PMU fighter.
 9 February 2019 - 2 Iraqi bomb disposal soldiers were killed while defusing a bomb in the city of Hīt, West of Ramadi.
 2 February 2019 - Popular Mobilization Forces killed 2 ISIL fighters trying to sneak into Diyala Governorate from the Hamreen mountains area.
 17 March 2019 - Clashes between the Iraqi Army and PKK in Sinjar left 2 Iraqi soldiers dead and 5 militants wounded according to the Iraqi Military. The fighting started after PKK militia fighters were denied passage through an army checkpoint.
 7 July 2019 - The Iraqi army launched an Operation, dubbed "Will of Victory" to clear the Salahaddin, Nineveh and Anbar provinces of ISIL sleeper cells. It had concluded by 11 July 2019.

August 
 4 August 2019 - ISIL claimed to have destroyed 4 Iraqi government vehicles and to have killed a police officer with an IED in Baghdad, ISIL later released a video showing the attack.
 10 August 2019 - A US marine was killed in the Nineveh Governorate by ISIL while advising Iraqi security forces.

September 
 10 September 2019 - A massive bombing of Qanus Island, on the Tigris River south of Mosul, leveled an ISIL transit and operations hub. Over 80,000 pounds of laser-guided bombs left behind a heavily cratered island.
 20 September 2019 – 2019 Karbala bombing: An unidentified man boarded a minibus in the southern Iraqi city of Karbala, disembarking a little later after having left a bag behind. It exploded shortly afterwards, killing 12 and wounding five others. The suspect was later arrested and the Islamic State of Iraq and the Levant claimed responsibility. The bombing was one of the worst attack against civilians since the end of the War in Iraq.

October 
 21 October 2019 - ISIL attacked an Iraqi security checkpoint in the Allas oilfields area in northern Salahuddin province, killing 2 and wounding 3 security members.
 30 October 2019 - Rockets were fired into the Green Zone in Baghdad near the US embassy amid mass protests against the Iraqi government, an Iraqi soldier was reportedly killed by the rocket fire.

November 
 26 November 2019 - Six ISIL members were killed following a police chase in the area of Wadi al-Karha, southwest of Kirkuk.

December 
 3 December 2019 - Iraqi security forces announce the capture of Baghdadi's "deputy" who operated under the name of "Abu Khaldoun". According to security officials, a police unit in Hawija, Kirkuk Governorate, tracked down Khaldoun to an apartment in the March 1 area where he was hiding; he possessed a fake I.D. under the name of Shaalan Obeid when apprehended. Khaldoun was previously ISIL's "military prince" of Iraq's Saladin Governorate.
 17 December 2019 - A coalition airstrike targeted ISIS locations in Makhmur District.

2020

January–February 
 16 January 2020 - An Iraqi SWAT team announced the capture of ISIS mufti Abu Abdul Bari, also known as Shifa al-Nima, in Mosul who authorized the destruction of Prophet Jonah Mosque on 24 July 2014. Amusingly, he was taken away on the back of a truck, since he weighted .
 19 January 2020 - Iraqi counter terrorism forces (ICTS) arrested an ISIS security official in Fallujah.

March 

 8 March 2020 - Two American soldiers were "killed by enemy forces while advising and accompanying Iraqi Security Forces during a mission to eliminate an ISIS terrorist stronghold in a mountainous area of north central Iraq", according to the U.S.-led coalition in Baghdad. One French special Operator was also wounded in the firefight, ISIS casualties were estimated to be 17–19 killed. The two U.S. Marine Raiders were killed in the Qara Chokh Mountains near Makhmur.

April 
 April 28, 2020 -  A militant wearing a suicide vest attacked the Intelligence and Counter-Terrorism Directorate in the Qadisiyah neighborhood of Kirkuk, wounding three Iraqi security personnel. Iraqi government officials blamed the Islamic State of Iraq and the Levant.

May–November 
 May 2, 2020 -  At least ten members of the PMF were killed in an attack by ISIS.

December 
 December 14, 2020 - 42 ISIS fighters were killed by Iraqi forces in the Nineveh governorate

2021

January 
 January 17, 2021 - An IED was activated against an Iraqi army vehicle in a village north of Tal Afar, about 60 km west of Mosul. Lieutenant Colonel Haidar Adel Mohammad, an Iraqi army foj commander, was killed. In addition, eight soldiers were killed, as well as the mukhtar of one of the nearby villages. According to ISIS, he was an Iraqi army collaborator.
 January 21, 2021 - The 2021 Baghdad bombings took place, killing at least 34 people (including the two attackers) and injuring 110 of those 36 are being treated in hospitals. ISIS is suspected of carrying out the attack. This was the first major deadly terrorist attack in the city since January 2018.
 January 22, 2021 - ISIS targeted an Iraqi army compound with machine gun fire about 70 km south of Kirkuk. Two soldiers were killed.
 January 23, 2021 - At least 11 fighters from the Popular Mobilization Forces (PMU) militias, were killed in an ambush by ISIS in Saladin Province.
 January 24, 2021 - Iraq's president, Barham Salih, ratified 340 death sentences of arrested ISIS militants and affiliates.
January 27, 2021 - 11 ISIS fighters including three leaders, one of them Abu Yasser al-Issawi, were killed in a counter-terrorism operation in Al-Chai Valley, southern Kirkuk.
January 29, 2021 - an Iraqi policeman was targeted by machine gun fire on the Kirkuk-Tikrit road. He was killed. An Iraqi police assistance force arriving at the scene was targeted by RPG rockets and machine gun fire. Several policemen were killed or wounded. Six vehicles were put out of commission.
January 30, 2021 - an Iraqi army force killed Muthanna Shataran al-Marawi, ISIS's military commander in charge of the Al-Rutba region, in western Iraq.

February 
 February 1, 2021 - British Royal Air Force carry out airstrikes against ISIS sleeper cells. An IED was activated against an Iraqi police vehicle near a village about 70 km southwest of Kirkuk. Two policemen were killed.
 February 2, 2021 - 5 members of the PMF were killed by IS militants in a clash in Diyala province. ISIS operatives fired machine guns and RPG rockets at an Iraqi army position west of Tuz Khormato, about 100 km northeast of Samarra. Two soldiers were killed and another was wounded. In addition, ISIS operatives fired machine guns at a Popular Mobilization camp in the Karmah region, about 20 km northeast of Fallujah. A Popular Mobilization fighter was killed and another was wounded.
 February 4, 2021 - ISIS operatives attacked an Iraqi army force west of Khanaqin. One soldier was killed and two others were wounded.
 February 5, 2021 - At least one soldier was killed and two wounded in an ISIS attack that targeted Iraqi security forces in northern Kirkuk province. In addition, ISIS operatives fired at an Iraqi police camp about 30 km south of Kirkuk. One policeman was killed and three others were wounded.
 February 6, 2021 - ISIS operatives fired machine guns at an Iraqi army force that tried to ambush them about 20 km south of Fallujah. One soldier was killed and two others were wounded.
 February 10, 2021 - Islamic State (IS) militants attacked the Iraqi Army forces in the eastern province of Diyala, killing at least one soldier.
 February 11, 2021 - an Iraqi police compound was targeted by machine guns south of Daquq, in southern Kirkuk. Four policemen were killed and three others were wounded.
 February 13, 2021 - an Iraqi soldier was targeted by machine gun fire north of Jalula, about 75 km northeast of Baqubah. The soldier was killed. A thermal camera was destroyed.
 February 15, 2021 - an IED was activated against an Iraqi army force in the southern Daquq area, about 70 km south of Kirkuk. One soldier was killed and several others were wounded. The Iraqi Air Force also attacked ISIS targets in the province of Diyala. At least five ISIS operatives were reportedly killed.
 February 17, 2021 - an Iraqi army compound west of Tuz Khormato, about 100 km northeast of Samarra, was targeted by machine gun fire and RPG rockets. Two soldiers were killed.
 February 18, 2021 - the Popular Mobilization Forces announced that three of its members were killed and 5 were wounded in an attack by the Islamic State (ISIS) in the outskirts of Khanaqin district in Diyala.
February 20, 2021 - the government-backed Popular Mobilization Forces killed two ISIS leaders in an operation in the Tarmiyah area around 30 kilometers north of Baghdad, afterwards clashes erupted between the two sides in the same area, leaving three Popular Mobilization Forces members killed and two others wounded while three ISIS members were killed. On the same day a roadside bomb planted by ISIS members exploded near a Popular Mobilization Forces vehicle in Jurf al-Sakhar around 50 kilometers south of Baghdad, killing a paramilitary member and wounding two others.
February 28, 2021 - Eight Iraqi soldiers and Tribal Mobilization fighters were killed and at least 7 more wounded after ISIS militants set off a car bomb in tha Haditha area of Anbar province, close to the Syria-Iraqi border. On the same day, a PMF vehicle was targeted with gunfire in the Kanaan area. Three PMF fighters were killed and the vehicle was destroyed. Two Iraqi soldiers were also targeted by gunfire in the Tarmiyah area, killing one soldier and wounding the other.
February 29, 2021 -  A soldier and four tribal fighters were killed and four others were injured in a bombing as they were carrying out a search operation in al-Madham, 80 kilometers west of Haditha.

March
March 3, 2021 - An IED exploded, targeting Iraqi soldiers in the Hamrin area. The blast killed one soldier. An Iraqi army camp was also targeted in the Mashahida area, resulting in the death of 1 soldier.
March 5, 2021 - 5 Iraqi policemen were killed and another 5 were wounded after IS attacked police checkpoints in the Mutaybijah area.
March 8, 2021 - 1 Iraqi army captain was killed in a gunfight in northern Baghdad and another civilian was killed and 8 injured in a separate attack as a person threw a grenade at them in Baghdad. On the same day, 8 ISIS militants were arrested in three provinces.
March 9, 2021 -  Airstrikes destroyed a site containing 10 ISIS militants in Nineveh province in northern Iraq. Iraqi security forces also killed two ISIS militants.
March 10, 2021 - British RAF jets conducted airstrikes on IS held caves west of Erbil, northern Iraq. Two caves were successfully destroyed.
March 11, 2021 - One Iraqi soldier was killed after he was targeted by machine gun fire in the outskirts of Miqdadiya.
March 11, 2021 - Two Iraqi soldiers were killed after an army outpost was attacked south of Daquq.
March 12, 2021 - IS militants dressed in military uniforms massacred 7 members of the same family in the village of Albu Daur, south of Tikrit in Salah ad-Din province.
March 13, 2021 - One Iraqi policeman was killed and another was wounded after an armed attack on a police post in the Riyad area, southwest of Kirkuk. On the same day, Iraqi army personnel attacked IS militants travelling over the Syrian-Iraqi border. The militants eventually fled to Syria after an exchange of fire that left one Iraqi soldier dead.
March 14, 2021 - IS militants killed a Tribal PMF member and his daughter after they stormed their house in Tarimiya district, north of Baghdad.
March 15, 2021 - One Iraqi soldier was killed and another was wounded after IS militants activated an IED targeting an Iraqi army foot patrol in the Al-Ghaith area.
March 18, 2021 - ISIS ambushed a PMF convoy near the Samarra area. Six PMF fighters were killed in the exchange of fire. Another PMF fighter was also killed and two policemen were wounded by gunfire in a separate incident in the Rashad area, near Kirkuk.
March 20, 2021 - Two Shi’ite civilians were abducted and executed by ISIS fighters in the Abarah area. 
March 22, 2021 - The coalition announces that it has conducted 133 airstrikes against ISIL over the past ten days in Iraq destroying 61 hideouts, 24 caves and killing dozens of ISIL militants with Iraqi forces leading the ground effort.
March 24, 2021 - An Iraqi army camp was attacked by IS militants west of Tuz Khormato. The attack left 1 Iraqi soldier dead and 2 more wounded.
March 26, 2021 - The Iraqi government announced that fortifications, including thermal cameras and control towers, have been installed along the Iraqi-Syrian border to prevent the infiltration of ISIS from neighboring Syria which comes as ISIS militants have stepped up their attacks in 2021.
On the same day ISIL forces detonated an IED targeting PMF forces in the Saadiya region, leaving one PMF fighter dead and three others wounded.
March 29, 2021 - the PMF announced that the commander of the 314th PMF Brigade and a member of the 315th PMF Brigade were both killed after clashing with militants in an anti-ISIL operation in the Samarra area.

April
April 1, 2021 - The coalition destroyed a cave killing an ISIS militant in Therthar valley between Saladin and Anbar Governorate, meanwhile, Iraqi forces found 60 IEDs belonged to ISIS in Kirkuk Governorate.
April 5, 2021 - An Iraqi policeman was killed after an IS attack on a police outpost in the Riyad region, near Kirkuk.
April 7, 2021 - Iraq announces that it has killed 34 ISIS militants and arrested 99 during a 3-month long operation against the terrorist group around the country. 60 ISIS militants were also killed in a 10-day long operation near the town of Makhmur in northern Iraq.
April 10, 2021 - An Iraqi policeman was killed in Daquq after ISIL militants targeted a police outpost.
April 11, 2021 - a Tribal Mobilization outpost was targeted by ISIL gunfire in southern Daquq, in the southern part of Kirkuk. One fighter was killed and another was wounded.
April 12, 2021 - Three Iraqi soldiers were killed and 2 more were wounded after an IED exploded in the Kara Tapa area. An Iraqi intelligence operative was also assassinated near Tarmiyah.
April 13, 2021 - Three Iraqi policemen were killed and another wounded after ISIL operatives attacked their camp in the Daquq area.
April 14, 2021 - A Turkish soldier was killed after rockets were fired at a Turkish military base in Iraq's north Bashiqa region.
April 15, 2021 - Two joint Iraqi-PMF camps were attacked by ISIS operatives in the Tuz Khormato region, leaving three soldiers dead.
April 16, 2021 - Four Iraqi soldiers were killed after IS militants attacked three joint Iraqi-PMF army camps near the Al-Haliwa airport, south of Kirkuk. An Iraqi army camp was also attacked near Al-Kayf, killing two Iraqi soldiers. Furthermore, an Iraqi police camp was also targeted by gunfire in the Riyad region, killing two policemen.
April 19, 2021 - Two army camps south of the Al-Azim area, were targeted by IS gunfire. Two Iraqi soldiers were killed and an officer and a soldier were wounded. IS militants also destroyed 40 generators and transformers used by Tribal Mobilisation forces.
April 20, 2021 - Houses of Shiite residents were targeted by gunfire about 90 km northeast of Baqubah. One resident was killed, and four houses and two cars were set on fire. An Iraqi army patrol arriving on the scene to provide assistance was targeted by an IED and gunfire. Three soldiers were killed and two officers and another soldier were wounded. ISIL later posted images of the events on their telegram.
April 22, 2021 - An IED was activated against an Iraqi army vehicle in the Al-Waqf region, northwest of Baqubah. One soldier was killed and three others were wounded. An Iraqi police patrol that arrived on the scene was targeted by gunfire and also hit by an IED. Six policemen, including an officer, were killed, and two others were wounded. Two Iraqi policemen were also killed after militants attacked an Iraq police camp Al-Sous, south of Kirkuk.
April 24, 2021 - Two Iraqi police officers and a civilian were killed in an ISIL double bombing in the province of Diyala. A civilian was also shot dead in Diyala later in the day, after militants fired at Iraqi security personnel.
April 25, 2021 - Suspected IS militants raided Qayee village in the Khanaqin district, killing the village chief and wounding two others. On the same day, an IED was activated against a Tribal Mobilization vehicle near Baqubah. One fighter was killed and three others were wounded.
 April 26, 2021 - An IED exploded in the village of Jizani, targeting a Rapid Response unit deployed from Baghdad to sweep the area. The attack killed an intelligence officer and injured six members of the unit, including the commanding officer. On the same day an IED killed a PMF fighter in the Hammam al-Alil subdistrict of Ninewa province.
April 27, 2021 - Four Iraqi policemen were killed while attempting to diffuse a bomb planted by ISIL militants in Al-Rashad district in Kirkuk province.
April 29, 2021 - An IED explosion killed a brigadier general in Iraq's Border Guard and his driver while they were travelling on a highway in Anbar province. On the same day, sniper fire a killed a PMF fighter in the Yathrib subdistrict south of Samarra in Salah ad-Din province.
April 30, 2021 - An IED attack by ISIS killed 4 Iraqi soldiers in the Tarmiya area of north Baghdad. An Iraqi policeman was also killed during an ISIS attack in Daquq, Kirkuk

May
May 1, 2021 - 3 Peshmerga fighters, including a captain, were killed after ISIL militants attacked Peshmerga positions close to the village of Qaya Bashi, Kirkuk. An Iraqi Brigadier General and another officer were killed by an ISIS IED blast in Akashat, west of Anbar province.
May 5, 2021 - ISIL militants destroyed two oil wells and killed an Iraqi policeman at the Bay Hassan oil field in Kirkuk province.
May 9, 2021 - the Popular Mobilization Forces (PMF) said that ISIL militants attacked its checkpoints in al-Jalisiya area near Samara in Salah ad-Din province. The attack killed two PMF fighters and injured another two.
May 11, 2021 - British RAF Typhoons targeted a group of ISIS fighters southwest of Mosul. Several IS militants were killed in the airstrikes. ISIL attacked a checkpoint in Kifri district in Diyala province, killing a Peshmerga fighter.
May 14, 2021 - an ISIL attack with two IEDs damaged power transfer towers in Riyadh subdistrict, west of Kirkuk province.
May 16, 2021 - another ISIL attack heavily damaged two towers of the Mirsad-Diyala power transfer line in the Khanaqin district of Diyala province.
May 17, 2021 - Iraqi forces came under fire from ISIL militants near the city of Mosul and a pair of Eurofighter Typhoons from the international coalition attacked the terrorists, killing a number of ISIL militants.
May 19, 2021 -  ISIL attacked checkpoint of tribal fighters in the Buhruz subdistrict of Diyala province. One tribal fighter was killed in the attack.
May 22, 2021 - ISIS militants killed Majid al-Obeidi, a tribal leader in Salah ad-Din province, after they raided his house. One ISIL militant was also killed in the raid.
May 23, 2021 - 4 ISIL militants were killed in an airdrop operation by Iraqi forces in eastern Iraq.
May 28, 2021 - ISIL released a video of them executing at least 8 Iraqi 'collaborators' in a series of assassination videos and two beheading videos.
May 29, 2021 - A PMF fighter was killed by ISIS sniper fire whilst repelling an infiltration attempt by ISIS in Diyala.

June

 June 1, 2021 -  Kurdish Forces along with French special forces targeted an ISIL hideout near the city of Kifri at night, killing 8 militants.
June 3, 2021 - An explosion at a crowded restaurant within a highly protected Shia shrine area of al-Kadhimiya neighborhood in northern Baghdad killed four people and injured 36 others. The Iraqi government claimed it was a propane tank that blew up however on June 4, ISIS claimed responsibility, saying it was an IED that exploded. The Iraqi government arrested 7 individuals in relation to the explosion.
June 4, 2021 -  The Iraqi Interior Ministry announces the detention of 964 wanted terrorists during a series of campaigns carried out from May 20 to 3 June.
June 7, 2021 - One PMF fighter was killed and another was wounded during clashes with an ISIS cell, northeast of Baquba, Diyala province.
June 8, 2021 - An ISIS member was killed by Iraqi forces near Khanaqin in Diyala.
June 9, 2021 - Iraqi forces found the bodies of 11 Yazidis that were killed in Sinjar by ISIL in 2014. 18 terror suspects were also arrested by Iraqi forces in Nineveh Also, A man was killed and his son was wounded in an attack carried out by ISIS on a village west of Kirkuk.
June 12, 2021 - ISIS militants attacked a Federal Police checkpoint in the Riyadh subdistrict in western Kirkuk province, killing a police captain and injured a policeman.
June 13, 2021 - A mass grave was opened in Nineveh Governorate, which contained the remains of 123 victims of ISIL, all of whom were inmates of the Badoush prison complex.
June 14, 2021 -  The Iraqi Counter-Terrorism Service that its commando forces have killed 13 ISIL militants around the country in June so far.
June 15, 2021 - 3 Iraqi army soldiers were killed by an IED explosion in the village of Muradiyat al-Zahawi, southwest of Baquba, in Diyala Province.
June 16, 2021 - An Iraqi policeman was killed by ISIL sniper fire near the village of Abdul Hamid on the outskirts of Al-Abbara district, northeast of Baquba.
June 19, 2021 - Iraqi forces arrests 10 ISIL militants in the Kirkuk province.
20 June 2021 - 3 civilians were killed by an ISIS sniper attack in Albu Bakr in Al-Azim, north of Baquba. 
21 June 2021 – An ISIS militant was killed during an ambush in Diyala. On the same day an ISIS Shariah judge was sentenced to death by hanging.
22 June 2021 - Iraqi security forces discovered the bodies of a farmer and his son in Diyala, two hours after they were kidnapped by ISIS operatives.
24 June 2021 - 5 Iraqi police officers were killed after ISIS attacked their checkpoint in the village of Shabija Saud, west of Daquq district, south of Kirkuk.
25 June 2021 - The Iraqi judiciary sentenced 13 ISIS convicts to death.
26 June 2021 - 2 Iraqi police officers were killed and another was wounded after ISIS attacked their positions in the village of Abu Khanajer, west of Kirkuk.
29 June 2021 - An ISIS militant was killed by PMU forces while he was trying to blow up an electric power transmission tower northeast of Baquba.

July

July 3, 2021 - 4 civilians were killed and 3 were wounded after ISIS attacked a group of fishermen in the Al-Zarka area in Haditha district, west of Anbar.
 July 5, 2021 - ISIS ambushed a group of armed civilians on the outskirts of Saif Saad, south of Qara Tabeh district, north of Jalawla. 5 of the armed civilians were killed and 2 others were wounded in the ambush.
 July 8, 2021 - One Iraqi policeman was killed and two others were wounded after ISIS launched an attack on their police checkpoint in the village of Maryam Bek, south of Kirkuk.
 July 9, 2021 - An ISIS militant was killed by Iraqi security forces after they chased him near the village of Lsan in Al-Rashad district, south of Kirkuk.
 July 13, 2021 - An Iraqi policeman was killed after ISIS operatives attacked the police's 18th Brigade near the village of Tal Khadija. On the same day, 2 Iraqi policemen were killed after unidentified gunmen targeted them in Tal Al-Taseh in Tarmiyah.
 July 14, 2021 - A farmer was abducted and executed by ISIS militants after they attacked the village of Shayala Al-Abli, in Al-Qarraj district, southeast of Mosul.
 July 15, 2021 - 2 ISIS militants were killed and another was injured after Iraqi police launched an anti-terror operation in the Al-Rashad sector in the Karha Valley Ghazan in Kirkuk. A civilian was killed by ISIS after they drove though an IS checkpoint in the Qara Bek area of Kirkuk's Dibis district.
 July 17, 2021 - 4 Iraqi soldiers were killed after ISIS operatives attacked an Iraqi army post in the village of Idris Arab, in Dibis district. On the same day, PMF forces conducted an anti-terror operation in the Shamiya area near Haditha in Anbar, killing 7 ISIS members.
 July 17, 2021 - ISIS attacked a quarry in the Hit district of Anbar province, killing two factory employees and injuring three others. On the same day, PMF forces seized an IS camp in the western desert of Anbar, killing one ISIS operative.
 July 19, 2021 - A suicide bombing took place in Baghdad, killing at least 30 people and wounding dozens more. ISIS claimed responsibility for the attack via telegram.
 July 21, 2021 - 2 Iraqi soldiers were killed after ISIS militants attacked an army headquarters in the Mutaibija sector, east of Salah al-Din Governorate.
 July 22, 2021 - 2 Iraqi army soldiers and a tribal fighter were killed after ISIS operatives attacked a military checkpoint west of Al-Rutba district in Anbar Governorate.
 July 23, 2021 - 3 Iraqi police were killed and another was wounded after ISIS elements attacked the village of (Garha Kazan) south of Kirkuk towards Tikrit
 July 26, 2021 - 2 civilians were killed by ISIS during an attack on the village of Mukhaisah, on the outskirts of Abi Saida district, northeast of Baquba.
 July 27, 2021 - A civilian was killed in an ISIS attack on a security point northeast of Baquba, Diyala Governorate.
 July 30, 2021 - 4 civilians were killed and 16 were wounded after ISIS attacked a funeral hall in Yathrib district, south of Salah al-Din. On the same day two civilians were killed by ISIL militants in the Tarmiyah district north of Baghdad. ISIL operatives also attacked an ISF checkpoint Halwan area of Diyala province, killing 4 civilians.
 July 31, 2021 - One PMF fighter was killed after an IED exploded under a PMF vehicle in the al-Zarga subdistrict in Salah ad-Din province.

August

 August 1 - a civilian was killed after a roadside bomb was detonated in the Baaj district of Ninewa province.
 August 2 - 1 Iraqi federal policeman was killed and 3 others were wounded after ISIS attacked the village of Al-Asfar, south of Kirkuk. On the same day, 'unidentified' operatives shot dead the commander of the PMF's 9th brigade, Abu Sadiq al-Khashkhashi along with one of his bodyguards, in Babylon province. 2 civilians were also killed in an attack in the al-Dhuloiyah district of Salah ad-Din.
 August 5 - Iraqi Federal police arrested an ISIL member in the city of Mosul.
August 6 -  ISIS militants attacked an Iraqi military outpost south of Daquq in Kirkuk province, killing one Iraqi soldier.
August 7 - ISIL snipers attacked al-Nabai, north of Baghdad, killing one Iraqi soldier and wounding another.
August 8 - An Iraqi policeman was killed northeast of Baquba in Diyala province, after ISIL snipers targeted a police checkpoint.
August 9 - a former anti-ISIL tribal fighter was beheaded at a digging site in Kirkuk after ISIL militants stormed a nearby village and attacked the site. On the same day, Iraqi security forces killed Omar Jawad al-Mashhadani, a key transporter of ISIS suicide bombers, during an ambush in Tarmiyah district. Later in the day, a tribal fighter was killed and two more were wounded after ISIL operatives attacked a checkpoint in the village of Maizila in Makhmour district, southeast of Mosul.
August 13 - ISIL claimed responsibility of the assassination of a mukhtar of the village of Al-Nahiya, on the outskirts of Al-Sharqat district.
August 17 - 3 Iraqi soldiers were killed and a fourth was wounded in an ISIL attack targeting a military checkpoint in the village of Al-Ali within the northern Muqdadiyah sector, northeast of Baquba. Furthermore, two ISIL operatives were killed in an Iraqi Air Force airstrike in Kirkuk province.
August 20 - Four soldiers of the PMF, including a commander, were killed whilst repelling an ISIL attack in the Tarmiyah orchards north of Baghdad.

August 21 - ISIS released a hostage they kidnapped near Mosul, after their family had paid a ransom for his release.
August 23 - An Iraqi Air Force airstrike killed 3 ISIS militants in Salah ad-Din, during a counter insurgency operation. 2 Iraqi soldiers were also injured in the operation.
August 28 - Iraqi special forces killed a suspected ISIL suicide bomber who was preparing to attack an area south of Kirkuk.
August 29 - An Iraqi policeman was killed and 4 police vehicles were burnt out during an ISIL attack in the village of Marata, west of Kirkuk.

August 30 - Two ISIS militants were killed and another was arrested by Iraqi security forces in Diyala. An Iraqi border guard was also killed during an ISIS attack in the Akashat region of Anbar province. A soldier was captured during the attack and was found beheaded two days later on the Syrian border.

September

September 1 - An Iraqi soldier was killed and 7 more were wounded after ISIS operatives attacked the village of Al-Sahel in Serklan district. The son of the village mayor was also kidnapped by ISIS in the same attack.
September 4 - Two Iraqi policemen were killed in an ISIL attack on a federal police checkpoint near the village of Sateeh.
September 5 - 13 Iraqi policemen were killed in an ISIS attack in the region of Al-Rashad south of Kirkuk city. On the same day, 3 Iraqi soldiers were killed and another was seriously wounded after ISIS attacked an army checkpoint in Karaj district of Makhmour district, southeast of Mosul. ISIL also attacked forces of the PMF with an IED in the Al-Owaisat area, north of Jurf Al-Nasr district, killing Hassan Karim Hassan, the assistant commander of the 'Al-Jazeera operations' and wounding two other members of the PMF.
September 8 - 4 ISIS militants were killed in an Iraqi security operation in Kirkuk province.
September 11 - 4 people, including a captain and soldier of the PMF were killed in an ISIS attack in the village of Khattab within Makhmour district. On the same day, 3 Iraqi policemen were killed during an ISIS attack on the village of Al-Saidi, in Daquq district, south of Kirkuk.
September 12 - 6 ISIS militants were killed in an Iraqi airstrike in Kirkuk province. On the same day, 3 Iraqi soldiers were killed and another was wounded after ISIL operatives attacked their military checkpoint near the village of Al-Tala'a, north of Baquba. Another Iraqi soldier was also wounded in a separate attack nearby.
September 14 - Iraqi Army Lieutenant-Colonel Zaid Jassim Al-Shammari died of wounds he sustained during an ISIS attack in Diyala two days prior.
September 15 - An Iraqi soldier was killed and 3 others were wounded after ISIS operatives attacked a military checkpoint in Baquba. On the same day, an Iraqi soldier died of wounds he sustained in an ISIL attack the previous day near Baquba.
September 23 - The Iraqi ministry of intelligence announced that 7 ISIS militants were killed in a security operation in the Hamrin mountain range.
September 26 - a lieutenant colonel and a policeman were killed in an ISIS attack on their checkpoint in the outskirts of Muqdadiya.
September 28 - An ISIS member was killed by Iraqi security forces in the Mukashifa district of Salah al-Din. On the same day, an Iraqi soldier was killed in an ISIS attack in Al-Baaj, west of Mosul.

October

October 1 - A spokesman for the Iraqi armed forces announced the killing of 8 ISIS members during a military operation in Kirkuk governorate.
October 3 - An Iraqi soldier was killed and 3 others, including and officer, were wounded after ISIL operatives attacked a military checkpoint on the border between Diyala and Salah al-Din.
October 4 - An Iraqi athlete was killed after ISIL snipers targeted them as they were receiving sports equipment from a stadium on the outskirts of Muqdadiya district, Diyala.
October 5 - ISIL's Amaq News Agency released a 50-minute video of IS operations in Iraq. The footage showed the execution of at least 22 people including 2 beheadings and several minutes of combat footage against Iraqi and allied forces.
October 10 - A police major was killed and another policeman was injured after IS militants attacked the village of Sateeh, southwest of Kirkuk.
October 11 - ISIL's chief financer, Sami Jasim Muhammad al-Jaburi, was arrested by Iraqi security forces in Baghdad.
October 18 - Abu Ubaida Baghdad, the IS militant responsible for the 2016 Karrada bombing was arrested by Iraqi security forces after a complex intelligence mission outside of Iraq.
October 19 - ISIL released footage of them executing a man who had 'abandoned islam' and who was allegedly making a living from repairing Iraq military vehicles.
October 21 - A civilian was killed and another was injured after ISIS militants attacked a police checkpoint near the town of Badush, northwest of Mosul.
October 22 - The Iraqi defence ministry announced that Iraqi security forces had killed Osama al-Mulla, ISIS's deputy chief in charge of security, during a security operation in Al-Rutba, in western Iraq.
October 26 - A soldier of the PMF was killed and 2 others were wounded in an ISIS attack on a PMF checkpoint on the outskirts of Al-Saadiya district in Diyala governorate. Later that day, 11 civilians were killed and 18 more were wounded in an ISIS attack on predominantly-Shia Al-Rashad village in Diyala province. Iraqi president Barham Salih said the attack was a “despicable attempt to destabilise the country”. 8 Sunni civilians were later killed in a revenge attack by Shia tribesmen on the Sunni village of al-Imam

October 30 - 3 civilians were killed and 2 others were kidnapped by IS militants attacked a group of coal diggers on the banks of the Tigris River, Abbasi district, west of Kirkuk. On the same day, Iraqi forces killed an ISIS militant and wounded another near the Riyadh district, west of Kirkuk

November

November 2 - A soldier of the PMF died of wounds he sustained a day earlier whilst repelling an ISIS attack in the Akbashi sector in the outskirts of Khanaqin, northeast of Baquba.
November 7 - Two ISIS militants were killed and a third blew himself up during an Iraqi security operation in the western Anbar desert.
November 9 - A PMF soldier was killed in a clash with IS cells at the Hatra district junction, south of Mosul.
November 10 - A PMF soldier was killed in clashes with ISIS cells in Amirli, Salah al-Din. 2 civilians were also killed by ISIS gunfire during the attack.
November 12 - One ISIS militant was killed and another was wounded by Iraqi security forces in Wadi al-Shay, south of Kirkuk.
November 22 - An Iraqi soldier was killed and 3 others were injured after ISIS snipers targeted their military post in Ibrahim village, south of Baquba.
November 25 - A soldier of the PMF was killed and a civilian was injured during an ISIS attack on the village of al-Raya'a, northeast of Baquba.
November 27 - 5 Peshmerga fighters were killed and 4 others were wounded after ISIS operatives detonated a roadside bomb targeting Peshmerga fighters in the Kolju district in Garmian region of northern Iraq.

December

December 6 - 6 ISIS militants were killed in an Iraqi airstrike on an ISIS hideout in the Anbar desert.
December 8 - 2 ISIS militants were killed in an Iraqi air force operation in the Al-Kassar area in Anbar province.
December 16 – 3 Iraqi soldiers were killed and 3 others were wounded during clashes with IS forces in the Hamrin Basin, northeast of Baquba. On the same day, IS claimed responsibility for abducting and beheading Iraqi army Colonel Yasser Ali al-Jourani in the Northern Hamrin area, south of Kirkuk. They later released footage of the execution.
December 20 - Iraqi forces launched airstrikes on IS positions in the Sadiyah district of Diyala, killing 2 ISIS fighters.
December 22 - 2 PMF fighters were killed and 4 more were wounded by IS operatives after they attacked their positions in the Al-Fatah area of the Saladin Governorate.
December 26 - 2 ISIS militants were killed after Iraqi forces ambushed them in the Tarfawi area, west of Kirkuk.

2022

January 

January 6 – 11 Islamic State militants were killed in several security operations throughout Iraq.
January 16 – 4 civilians were abducted and executed by ISIL militants in the Qadiriyah area, south of Samarra. Another civilian was also abducted but later managed to escape after the militants believed he was dead after attempting to execute him.
January 19 – 3 ISIL fighters were killed during an Iraqi army security operation in the Taji area near Baghdad.
January 20–21 – In their deadliest operation against government forces in recent months, ISIL militants stormed an Iraqi army barracks in the al-Azim district north of Baqubah in Diyala Governorate, killing 11 Iraqi soldiers as they slept. The attack occurred "around 2:30 am against a base in the Hawi al-Azim area," according to an unidentified senior official. Provincial governor Muthanna al-Tamimi alleged that the jihadists "exploited the cold and the negligence of the soldiers," adding that the base was fortified and equipped with "a thermal camera, night vision goggles and a concrete watch-tower." The governor alleged that the attackers fled into Saladin Governorate.
January 22 – 3 ISIL fighters were killed in an Iraqi airstrike that targeted a gathering of ISIL vehicles south of the ancient city of Hatra.
January 23 – Iraqi security forces reportedly launched a large counter-terrorism operation from three directions against ISIL in north Diyala, including army and air force units and special operations personnel, with the assistance of local tribes and the PMF.
January 27 – An IS Emir by the name of 'Hawi the Great' was killed in an Iraqi airstrike in the Hamrin hills, northeast of Baquba.

February 
February 3 – An IS militant was killed and another was wounded in an Iraqi airstrike on their positions in the Salah al-Din Governorate.
February 10 – 4 ISIL militants were killed during a clash with Iraqi army forces near the Al-Azim Dam north of Diyala.

March 
March 8 – An Iraqi security checkpoint was attacked by ISIL snipers Abbar subdistrict, northeast of Baquba. One Iraqi service member was injured and later died of his wounds.
March 9 – An IS operative was killed whilst trying to attack an Iraqi army convoy in Salah ad-Din province, on the road leading to Haditha.
March 10 – 4 ISIS fighters were killed after the Iraqi airforce launched 2 airstrikes on ISIL positions in rural Kirkuk province.
March 13 – Two Iraqi soldiers were killed after IS fighters attack an Iraqi army checkpoint in the Qaraj subdistrict, southeast of Mosul.
March 15 – An IED explosion took place targeting an Iraqi police vehicle in the Rashad subdistrict, west of Kirkuk, killing one Iraqi police officer.
March 22 – One Iraqi soldier was killed and another was wounded after ISIS operatives attack an Iraqi army post early in the morning in Wadi al-Shai, south of Kirkuk.

April 

April 16 – Two PMF fighters were killed after ISIS militants attacked their positions in al-Eith region of Salah ad-Din province.
April 20 – Three PMF fighters were killed in an ISIS attacked a security post in Qara-Tappa, Diyala, with sniper and small arms fire.
April 21 – An ISIS militant was killed in clashes with Iraqi security personnel near Tuzkhormatu.

May 

May 1 – ISIL fighters attacked the village of Albu-Taraz, northeast of Baquba, killing one civilian and injuring two others.
May 2 – ISIL militants attack an Iraqi army outpost in the Kenaan subdistrict, southeast of Baquba, killing one Iraqi soldier.
May 16 – ISIL fighters killed two PMF soldiers in clashes in Salahaddin Province.
May 23- Six civilians were killed and an Iraqi soldier was injured after ISIL fighters attacked the village of Islah, north of the Jalawla subdistrict. On the same day, PMF forces were attacked by ISIL militants in the al-Hadhar district, south of Mosul, killing one PMF fighter. Furthermore, ISIL attacked farms in Taza district of Kirkuk province, killing six farmers.
May 25 – Two PMF fighters were killed in clashes with ISIS militants in the village of Sheik Najm near the Mansouriyah subdistrict, northeast of Baquba. On the same day, an ISIL fighter was killed by PMF forces in the Wana subdistrict, north of Mosul.

June 

In June 2022, 4 Iraqi security personnel, 46 ISIS fighters and 12 civilians were killed.

July 
In July 2022, 16 Iraqi security personnel, 22 ISIS fighters and 28 civilians were killed.

August 
In August 2022, 19 Iraqi security personnel, 36 ISIS fighters and 37 civilians were killed. A Dutch soldier was also wounded.

September 
In September 2022, 7 Iraqi security personnel, 62 ISIS militants and 19 civilians were killed.

October 
In October 2022, 8 Iraqi security personnel, 7 ISIS militants and at least 43 civilians were killed.

November 
In November 2022, 8 Iraqi security personnel, 27 ISIS fighters and 13 civilians were killed.

December 

 December 16 – An Iraqi police convoy hit a roadside bomb outside Kirkuk, with a firefight ensuing afterwards with IS fighters. A reported 9 officers and one IS fighter were killed.

In December 2022, 24 Iraqi security personnel, 51 ISIS militants and 37 civilians were killed in Iraq.

In 2022, at least 1,681 people were killed due to the conflict in Iraq.

2023

January 
In the month of January 2023, 6 Iraqi security personnel, 19 ISIS militants and 21 civilians were killed.

February

See also 

 Iraq Body Count project
 2015–2018 Iraqi protests
 2019–2021 Iraqi protests
 Eastern Syria insurgency, a similar insurgency in neighboring Syria
 Casualty recording
 List of terrorist incidents (1970–present)

References 

Articles containing video clips
Conflicts in 2017
 
Wars involving Iraq
Wars involving the Islamic State of Iraq and the Levant
Wars involving the Popular Mobilization Forces
2010s conflicts
2020s conflicts